iVardensphere is a Canadian band that plays a mixture of tribal-tinged industrial, EBM and power noise music, based in Edmonton, Alberta, Canada.

History

On June 16, 2009 via Synthetic Sounds the band released their full-length album titled Scatterface across Canada. And in Early 2010, released Scatterface V2 on Danse Macabre Records in Germany, for distribution in Europe, with 4 bonus remixes. On February 16, 2010 a remix album titled Remixes Vol. 1 was released by Synthetic Sounds and featured remixes from artists such as Memmaker, Komor Kommando and Left Spine Down.

The group has also remixed various other artists including Zombie Girl, Iszoloscope and Rotersand.

The band has played across North America with various acts and was the opening act on the Fall 2010 'Making Monsters Tour' for Combichrist and Aesthetic Perfection.

In August 2011 it was announced that Metropolis Records had signed the band with the next record titled APOK and set to come out November 9, 2011.

iVardensphere released a cover of the song Roots Bloody Roots by Brazilian thrash metal band Sepultura in August 2014.

In March 2015 iVardensphere released the album Fable.

Members
Scott Fox - electronics, drums
Jamie Blacker - vocals, electronics, drums
Jairus Khan - electronics
Chuck Murphy - drums, vocals
Daniel St-Pierre - drums

Former members
Sean Malley - drums

Discography

Albums
 Scatterface (2009)
 Bloodwater (2010)
 APOK (2011)
 I Dream in Noise: Remixes Vol. 2 (2012)
 The Methuselah Tree (2013)
 Fable (2015)
 Hesitation (2017)
 Exile (2017)

Singles & EPs
 Remixes Vol. 1 (2010)
 Break the Sky (2013)
 Cycle Of The Sun: Remixes Vol 1 (2013)
 Tribes Of Moth (2015)
 Stygian (2015)
 Dark Sciences Trilogy - Part 1 (2015)
 The Shattering Queen (2022)

References

External Links

 
 

2008 establishments in Alberta
Canadian industrial music groups
Canadian electronic music groups
Metropolis Records artists
Musical groups established in 2008
Musical groups from Edmonton
Musical quintets